Kosmos 136 ( meaning Cosmos 136) or Zenit-2 No.47 was a Soviet, first generation, low resolution, optical film-return reconnaissance satellite launched in 1966. In addition to its reconnaissance mission, the satellite was also used for scientific research.

Kosmos 136 was launched by a Vostok-2 rocket, serial number N15001-09, flying from Site 41/1 at the Plesetsk Cosmodrome. The launch took place at 12:00:01 GMT on 19 December 1966, and following its successful arrival in orbit the spacecraft received its Kosmos designation; along with the International Designator 1966-115A and the Satellite Catalog Number 02624.

After eight days in orbit, Kosmos 136 was deorbited, with its return capsule descending under parachute, landing at 06:00 GMT on 27 December 1966, and recovered by Soviet force.

References

Kosmos satellites
Spacecraft launched in 1966
Spacecraft which reentered in 1966
Zenit-2 satellites
1966 in the Soviet Union